Bill's Diner, also known as A Streetcar Named Desire, is a historic converted streetcar diner located at Chatham in Pittsylvania County, Virginia.  It was built in the mid-1920s, and used as a streetcar in Reidsville, North Carolina.  It was brought to Chatham in 1937, and converted for use as a diner.  A rear addition was added in the 1950s.

It was listed on the National Register of Historic Places in 1996.

References

Diners on the National Register of Historic Places
Diners in Virginia
Commercial buildings on the National Register of Historic Places in Virginia
Commercial buildings completed in 1937
Buildings and structures in Pittsylvania County, Virginia
National Register of Historic Places in Pittsylvania County, Virginia
Individually listed contributing properties to historic districts on the National Register in Virginia